Suomiart is the art association of Finnish Artists in Sweden. Established in 1977, the association has over 100 members.  

Suomiart runs art exhibitions, courses, excursions and other cultural events in Sweden. it also participates in international cultural projects. Suomiart also arranges a yearly competition called the Artist of the Year in Sweden. It is open for Swedish Finns as well as Finnish and Swedish-speaking Finns artists who live in Sweden. The artist of the year is chosen by a jury.

The Artist of the Year Award

References

External links
 SUOMIART

Art societies
Non-profit organizations based in Sweden